

What is Lightning Lab 

Lightning Lab is a startup accelerator in New Zealand, which has been operating since 2013. Lightning Lab is owned and managed by Creative HQ, a startup incubator in Wellington. Lightning Lab programmes have been delivered in Wellington, Auckland and Christchurch. Each Lightning Lab programme takes in up to 10 companies and provides each with structure, startup methodologies, business skills and focused support so they can successfully find the market fit for their products and rapidly grow their user base. Lightning Lab is also an investment pathway that has proven to be successful in building strong companies and significantly increasing their value to investors.

To date, Lightning Lab has guided 150 entrepreneurs (63 startups) through rigorous learning, mentoring and business development that has resulted in over $10 million in private investment following the programme’s Demo Day investment events.

Lightning Lab is sponsored nationally by Spark, Microsoft, and Callaghan Innovation, and programmes have been delivered by Creative HQ in Wellington, ICEHOUSE in Auckland, and CDC in Christchurch.

History 
Lightning Lab operates various different programmes that each have a separate focus. Some examples of Lightning Lab accelerators are:
 Lightning Lab Digital is the accelerator catered towards software companies and has been run in Auckland, Wellington and Christchurch. 
 Lightning Lab Manufacturing caters towards hardware startups, and there has been a single programme, run in Lower Hutt, Wellington. 
 Additionally, in 2016 Lightning Lab XX was held in Wellington with a focus on women-led companies with at least one woman on the founding team.

Several notable companies to come out of Lightning Lab include:

 Wipster 
 Cloud Cannon
 Publons

Get Involved 
While the Lightning Lab accelerator is no longer run, Creative HQ works to support startups and scale-ups through Incubator, Accelerator programmes and founder workshops. Their programmes bring discipline to startup life. Creative HQ provides coaching and mentoring, practical startup support, a place to work, advice and a community of founder alumni.

References

Startup accelerators
Business organisations based in New Zealand